Ameth Ramírez Bourdett (born 19 June 1993) is a Panamanian professional footballer.

Club career 
Ramírez left Plaza Amador for a week-long trial at Spanish giants Atlético Madrid in April 2013. He later moved abroad to play for Mexican third division side Linces de Tlaxcala, a satellite team of Pachuca who had declared interest in the player in August 2013. He returned to Plaza Amador in summer 2014.

Isidro Metapán 
Ramírez signed with Isidro Metapán of the Salvadoran Primera División for the Clausura 2018 tournament. Ramírez scored his first goal for Isidro Metapán in a 1–2 defeat against Audaz at the Estadio Jorge Calero Suárez.

References

External links
 

1993 births
Living people
Association football midfielders
Panamanian footballers
C.D. Plaza Amador players
Real Monarchs players
Panamanian expatriate footballers
Expatriate footballers in Mexico
Expatriate soccer players in the United States
USL Championship players
Panama under-20 international footballers